Narayan Das (also spelled Narayan Dass, born August 1902, date of death unknown) was an Indian politician from the state of Bihar who served as a Member of the Parliament, representing Darbhanga in the Lok Sabha, the lower house of the Indian Parliament. He was elected to the 1st Lok Sabha in 1952 and to the 2nd Lok Sabha in 1957, on both occasions as a candidate of the Indian National Congress party.

References

1902 births
Year of death missing
India MPs 1952–1957
India MPs 1957–1962
Indian National Congress politicians
Lok Sabha members from Bihar
People from Darbhanga district
India MPs 1962–1967